Twelve Thirty is a 2010 American drama film written and directed by Jeff Lipsky and starring Barbara Barrie, Reed Birney, Halley Feiffer, Jonathan Groff, Mamie Gummer, Portia Reiners, Rebecca Schull and Karen Young. The film premiered at the 2010 Montreal World Film Festival.

Premise
There are three women in the Langley household. Vivien (Karen Young), the mother, is caught between a fierce independence and an almost agoraphobic attachment to home. Seductive and confident Mel (Portia Reiners) is a 19 year-old mirror of her mother. Maura (Mamie Gummer), 22 year-old, is alienated afraid and unable to pinpoint her place in the world. They live together in a seemingly close household, yet each is very much alone. The family's status quo explodes when Jeff (Jonathan Groff) walks into their comfortable yet dysfunctional world. Bright, handsome, ambitious and sure of his future at the age of 22, he's also socially awkward and a sexual novice whose been infatuated with Mel since high school. When they begin working together at the same restaurant, he jumps at the opportunity to finally start a romance with the free-spirited girl. But Mel has other ideas about their time together.

Cast
 Mamie Gummer as Maura
 Jonathan Groff as Jeff
 Portia Reiners as Mel
 Karen Young as Vivien
 Reed Birney as Martin
 Barbara Barrie as Eve
 Halley Feiffer as Irina
 Rebecca Schull as Katherine
 Kirby Mitchell as Mr. Levinson
 Fred Berman as Chris
 Dan Gill as Irina's Boyfriend (uncredited)

Release
The film premiered at the 2010 Montreal World Film Festival. It later showed at the Angelika Film Center on January 14, 2011.

Reception
The film has a 17% rating on Rotten Tomatoes based on 12 reviews.  Eric Kohn of IndieWire graded the film a C+.

Roger Ebert awarded the film two and a half stars and wrote, "It doesn't work but I doubt you'll regret seeing it."

Steven Rea of The Philadelphia Inquirer awarded the film one and a half stars out of four and wrote, "Reiners and Gummer have respective moments where their talents shine, but there's not enough here to keep any but the most masochistic even moderately interested."

References

External links
 
 

2010 films
2010 drama films
American drama films
2010s English-language films
2010s American films